Ben 'Bon Bon' Broke-Smith is a professional drift driver from the United Kingdom.

He won the European Drift Championship in 2008, driving a Toyota Chaser JZX81. For the 2009 season he switched to a Nissan Skyline R32 with a 1JZ engine and narrowly missed out on the Prodrift Super Series title.

After a few years out of competition Ben made his return to the British Drift Championship in 2013, now back in a JZX81 Chaser.

On August 5, 2016, Ben married long-term girlfriend Samantha Wilson.

References

Drifting drivers
Living people
English racing drivers
Year of birth missing (living people)